Dédé is a 1989 French film by Jean-Louis Benoît. The duration is 80 minutes.

Synopsis
Loosely based on Hamlet, set in Algeria in 1957, Dédé goes to the marriage of his mother with uncle Raymond, brother of his late father, who died two months previously. Shocked by the sudden decision of his mother, Dédé meets childhoods friends Michel and Monique at the ceremony. One night his father appears to him to tell him that he was murdered by Raymond. Dédé vows to avenge his father.

Cast
 Luc Thuillier: Dédé 
 Didier Bezace: Raymond, the uncle 
 Hélène Vincent: Yvonne, the mother 
 Yves Afonso: Maurice, the father 
 Renée Faure: the grandmother
 Marion Grimault: Monique 
 Jacques Mathou: the curate 
 Philippe Demarle: Michel 
 Michel Berto: Louis

External links
 Dédé on IMDB.com

1989 films
French comedy-drama films
1980s French films